Episiotomy, also known as perineotomy, is a surgical incision of the perineum and the posterior vaginal wall generally done by a midwife or obstetrician. Episiotomy is usually performed during second stage of labor to quickly enlarge the opening for the baby to pass through. The incision, which can be done from the posterior midline of the vulva straight toward the anus or at an angle to the right or left (medio-lateral episiotomy), is performed under local anesthetic (pudendal anesthesia), and is sutured after delivery.
 
Its routine use is no longer recommended, as perineal massage, a form of the plastic surgeon's principle of 'skin tissue expansion' applied to the opening of the vagina, is an alternative painless method of enlarging the opening for the baby. Despite this, it is one of the most common surgical procedures specific to women. In the United States, as of 2012, it was performed in 12% of vaginal births. It is still widely practiced in many parts of the world, including Korea, Japan, Taiwan, China, and Spain.

Uses 
Vaginal tears can occur during childbirth, most often at the vaginal opening as the baby's head passes through, especially if the baby descends quickly. Episiotomy is done in an effort to prevent against soft-tissue tearing (perineal tear) which may involve the anal sphincter and rectum. Tears can involve the perineal skin or extend to the muscles and the anal sphincter and anus. The midwife or obstetrician may decide to make a surgical cut to the perineum with scissors or a scalpel to make the baby's birth easier and prevent severe tears that can be difficult to repair. The cut is repaired with stitches (sutures). Some childbirth facilities have a policy of routine episiotomy.

Specific reasons to do an episiotomy are unclear. Though indications on the need for episiotomy vary and may even be controversial (see discussion below), where the technique is applied, there are two main variations. Both are depicted in the above image.
 In one variation, the midline episiotomy, the line of incision is central over the anus. This technique bifurcates the perineal body, which is essential for the integrity of the pelvic floor. Precipitous birth can also sever—and more severely sever—the perineal body, leading to long-term complications such as incontinence. Therefore, the oblique technique is often applied (also pictured above).
 In the oblique technique, the perineal body is avoided, cutting only the vagina epithelium, skin, and muscles (transversalius and bulbospongiosus). This technique aids in avoiding trauma to the perineal body by either surgical or traumatic means.

In 2009, a Cochrane meta-analysis based on studies with over 5,000 women concluded that: "Restrictive episiotomy policies appear to have a number of benefits compared to policies based on routine episiotomy. There is less posterior perineal trauma, less suturing and fewer complications, no difference for most pain measures and severe vaginal or perineal trauma, but there was an increased risk of anterior perineal trauma with restrictive episiotomy". The authors were unable to find quality studies that compared mediolateral versus midline episiotomy.

Types 

There are four main types of episiotomy:
 Medio-lateral: The incision is made downward and outward from the midpoint of the fourchette either to the right or left.
Drawbacks include the chance of injury to the Bartholin's duct, therefore some practitioners have strongly discouraged lateral incisions.
This procedure is also not widely practised.

Controversy 

Traditionally, physicians have used episiotomies in an effort to deflect the cut in the perineal skin away from the anal sphincter muscle, as control over stool (faeces) is an important function of the anal sphincter, i.e. lessen perineal trauma, minimize postpartum pelvic floor dysfunction, and as muscles have a good blood supply, by avoiding damaging the anal sphincter muscle, reduce the loss of blood during delivery, and protect against neonatal trauma. While episiotomy is employed to obviate issues such as post-partum pain, incontinence, and sexual dysfunction, some studies suggest that episiotomy surgery itself can cause all of these problems. Research has shown that natural tears typically are less severe (although this is perhaps not surprising since an episiotomy is designed for when natural tearing will cause significant risks or trauma). Slow delivery of the head in between contractions will result in the least perineal damage. Studies in 2010 based on interviews with postpartum women have concluded that limiting perineal trauma during birth is conducive to continued sexual function after birth. At least one study has recommended that routine episiotomy be abandoned for this reason.

In various countries, routine episiotomy has been accepted medical practice for many years. Since about the 1960s, routine episiotomies have been rapidly losing popularity among obstetricians and midwives in almost all countries in Europe, Australia, Canada, and the United States. A nationwide U.S. population study suggested that 31% of women having babies in U.S. hospitals received episiotomies in 1997, compared with 56% in 1979. In Latin America it remains popular, and is performed in 90% of hospital births.

Discussion 
Having an episiotomy may increase perineal pain during postpartum recovery, resulting in trouble defecating, particularly in midline episiotomies. In addition, it may complicate sexual intercourse by making it painful and replacing erectile tissues in the vulva with scar tissue.

In cases where an episiotomy is indicated, a mediolateral incision may be preferable to a median (midline) incision, as the latter is associated with a higher risk of injury to the anal sphincter and the rectum. Damage to the anal sphincter caused by episiotomy can result in fecal incontinence (loss of control over defecation). Conversely, one of the reasons episiotomy is performed is to prevent tearing of the anal sphincter, which is also associated with faecal incontinence.

Impacts on sexual intercourse 

Some midwives compare routine episiotomy to female genital mutilation.  One study found that women who underwent episiotomy reported more painful intercourse and insufficient lubrication 12–18 months after birth but did not find any problems with orgasm or arousal.

Pain management

Perineal pain after episiotomy has immediate and long-term negative effects for women and their babies. These effects can interfere with breastfeeding and the care of the infant. The pain from injection sites and episiotomy is managed by the frequent assessment of the report of pain from the mother. Pain can come from possible lacerations, incisions, uterine contractions and sore nipples. Appropriate medications are usually administered. Nonpharmacologic interventions can also be used: a warm sitz bath increases blood flow to the area, decreases local discomfort, and promotes healing. Routine episiotomies have not been found to reduce the level of pain after the birth.

See also 
 Husband stitch
 Perineal massage

References

External links 
 Episiotomy, Merck Manual Professional Edition

 Stages of Labor, Merck Manual Professional Edition

 What I Don’t Tell My Students About ‘The Husband Stitch’, Electricliterature.com

Obstetrical procedures
Theriogenology